Alice Elsie Reeve (23 March 1885 – 6 April 1927) was a New Zealand jeweller. She was born in Melbourne, Victoria, Australia in 1885.

References

1885 births
1927 deaths
New Zealand jewellers
People from Melbourne
Australian emigrants to New Zealand
Australian jewellers
Women jewellers